Bharyamar Sookshikkuka is a 1968 Indian Malayalam-language film, directed by K. S. Sethumadhavan. The film revolves around Shobha (Sheela), who leads a happy life with her husband, who is a businessman and her life takes a turn for the worse when she falls in love with a singer.

Plot

Cast 
 Prem Nazir as Suresh
 Sheela as Shobha
 Adoor Bhasi as S. R. Pothuval
 Ammini as Madhavi Amma
 Kamalam as Mala Sinha
 Sankaradi as Devadas
 T. R. Omana as Devaki Amma
 K. P. Ummer as Dr. Pothuval
 Kamaladevi as Vasanthi
 Paravoor Bharathan as Dileep

Soundtrack 
The music and background score was composed by V. Dakshinamoorthy and lyrics for all the songs were penned by Sreekumaran Thampi.

References

External links 
 

1968 films
1960s Malayalam-language films
Films directed by K. S. Sethumadhavan